The Type 702 Berlin-class replenishment ship is a series of replenishment ships, originally designed and built for service in the German Navy (Deutsche Marine). Designed to support United Nations overseas missions, the Berlin class were initially to number four vessels. However, three hulls were cut from the initial order. The lead ship, began construction in 1999 and entered service in 2001. The second hull, was re-ordered in 1998, began construction in 2000 and entered service in 2002. The third hull, was ordered in 2008 to a modified design, began construction in 2010 and entered service in 2013. All three ships are in service and are based at Wilhelmshaven.

The Berlin-class design was selected as the basis for the Royal Canadian Navy's (RCN) replacement for the two former  auxiliary oiler replenishment (AOR) vessels which were retired in 2014. Two Berlin-class variants, described as Joint Support Ships, were ordered by the RCN to be built in Canada. As of 2022, the first vessel is under construction.

General characteristics

The Berlin-class replenishment ships are the largest vessels of the German Navy. Constructed with a double hull, they have a pronounced bow bulb. The vessels have two replenishment at sea stations, one to each per side of the ship and two electro-hydraulic container and cargo cranes. The Berlin class have capacity for 86 TEUs of shipping containers and can stack 26 TEUs in two layers on the upper deck. The ships have provision for a Marineeinsatzrettungzentrum (MERZ) unit which is a modular operations rescue centre aboard the ship. The MERZ is capable of holding 50 patients and providing them with emergency surgery, intensive care, internal medicine and dental services.

They have four Deutz-MWM diesel generators. The Berlin-class ships have a helipad aft and a hangar and can support two helicopters, either the Sea King or NH90 models which can be used for vertical replenishment. The vessels are equipped with radar and mine avoidance sonar and one of the radars is situated aft for use during helicopter takeoff and landing.

The Berlin class are armed with four MLG  autocannon for anti-aircraft defence and four  machine guns. The MLG 27 replaced older Bofors /70 guns. The vessels are also fitted for but not with Stinger surface-to-air missile (MANPADS) for point defence. The vessels have a complement of 159 plus 74 embarked.

List of ships

Construction and career
In 1994, the German Navy sought to construct four replenishment vessels, built in two batches. The ships were designed to support United Nations operations overseas. However, the project was trimmed to one and the design was finalised in mid-1996. The first hull was ordered in October 1996. A second hull was authorized in June 1998. The hulls of the ships were built by Flensburger Schiffbau-Gesellschaft at their shipyard in Flensburg, Germany, with the electronic systems installed by Lürssen and the superstructure, final outfitting and sea trials done by Krögerwerft. The first ship, Berlin, completed construction in 2001 and was commissioned into the German Navy on 11 April 2001. The second vessel, Frankfurt am Main followed in 2002 and was commissioned on 27 May 2002. The third ship, Bonn, was ordered on 3 December 2008 with increased power and accommodations and was built at Pennewerft in Wolgast. On 13 September 2013, Bonn was commissioned into service at Wilhelmshaven.

In 2007, Frankfurt am Main performed trials with Finnish  . In 2020, Berlin operated with Standing NATO Maritime Group 2 (SNMG 2).

Export

Royal Canadian Navy

Two ships will be procured to replace the two Protecteur-class vessels operated by the RCN until 2014 under the Joint Support Ship Project. The ships will be built by Seaspan Marine Corporation at the Vancouver Shipyards facility located in North Vancouver, British Columbia. The design was chosen over a design by BMT Technology. At the time, the option for a third was still possible. Canadian sailors previewed Bonn in order to make themselves familiar with the design.

The ships were originally to be named Queenston and Chateauguay, for battles from the War of 1812. This decision was reversed in September 2017, when it was announced that the ships would perpetuate the names Protecteur and Preserver.  it was estimated that the two Canadian ships would cost C$2.6bn (~€1.75bn) to build, and a further C$4.5bn (~€3bn) to operate over 25 years. The keel of the first ship was laid down on 16 January 2020.

Notes

Citations

References

External links

Berlin class data at Thyssenkrupp Marine Systems

 
Auxiliary ships of Germany
Auxiliary replenishment ship classes